Raghavan Chanderasekaran (born 8 June 1970) is an Indian weightlifter. He competed at the 1988 Summer Olympics and the 1996 Summer Olympics.

References

External links
 

1970 births
Living people
Indian male weightlifters
Olympic weightlifters of India
Weightlifters at the 1988 Summer Olympics
Weightlifters at the 1996 Summer Olympics
Place of birth missing (living people)
Commonwealth Games medallists in weightlifting
Commonwealth Games gold medallists for India
Commonwealth Games silver medallists for India
Weightlifters at the 1990 Commonwealth Games
Weightlifters at the 1994 Commonwealth Games
20th-century Indian people
Medallists at the 1990 Commonwealth Games
Medallists at the 1994 Commonwealth Games